Women's soccer began in South Africa during the 1960s and gained popularity in the 1990s, when the first national women's team was formed.

History
South African women's soccer started in 1960 during the Apartheid era. Orlando Pirates Women's Football Club and Mother City Girls were among the first women's soccer clubs formed in 1962.

National league
Sanlam National Women's Football League was set up in the late 1990s with the goal of increasing the number of women in soccer administration and a second season was played in 2002.  South Africa does not have a national women's football league. The league is believed to have been discontinued as no more seasons have been played since the early 2000s.

In 2012, then Minister of Sports and recreation, Fikile Mbalula, called for the creation of a women's football league after the national women's football team, Banyana Banyana, returned from the 2012 Olympic Games defeated.

National team

South Africa women's national football team, nicknamed "Banyana Banyana" has been participating in international soccer since 1993, when they beat Swaziland 14–0 on 30 May of that year. This is their biggest win to date.

The team is controlled by the South African Football Association.

International participation
, the South African national women's soccer team has not qualified for the FIFA Women's World Cup. They have been competing in the CAF Women's Championship since 1995. They qualified for the Olympic Games for the first time at the 2012 Olympic Games.

See also

Football in South Africa

References

 
Soccer in South Africa